Oaklands or Contee was a slave plantation owned by the Snowden family, and remains as a historic home surrounded by residential development.

Description and history
The house is a three-story Federal architecture manor of brick construction, and was built by Major Thomas Snowden and his wife Eliza Warfield from Bushy Park, Howard County. The  estate extended westward into modern Howard County. Richard Snowden inherited it from his father. His oldest daughter Anne Lousia Snowden inherited the estate and married Capt. John Contee, for whom "Contee" station of the B&O railroad was named.

In 1911, the estate was purchased by Charles R. Hoff and his wife who was a descendant of the Snowden family.

Slavery
Overseers of this plantation in the mid-1800s were described as particularly cruel to their slaves. Dennis Simms, born in 1841, recalled such in 1937 as part of the Library of Congress Slave Narrative project. "We had to toe the mark or be flogged with a rawhide whip, and almost every day there was from two to ten thrashings given on the plantations to disobedient Negro slaves...We all hated what they called the 'nine ninety-nine', usually a flogging until fell over unconscious or begged for mercy. We stuck pretty close to the cabins after dark, for it we were caught roaming about we would be unmercifully whipped. If a slave was caught beyond the limits of the plantation where he was employed, without the company of a white person or without written permit of his master, any person who apprehended him was permitted to give him 20 lashes across the bare back...We were never allowed to congregate after work, never went to church, and could not read or write for we were kept in ignorance. We were very unhappy...(captured runaways) besides being flogged, would be branded with a hot iron on the cheek with the letter 'R'." Simms said he knew two slaves so branded.

Present
The Oakland manor is surrounded by residential development. Access to the property is off of 13700 Oaklands Manor Drive.

See also
Richard Snowden
Montpelier Mansion (Laurel, Maryland)

References

External links
 Oaklands, Colonial Mansions of Maryland and Delaware: Prince George's County, Maryland (John Martin Hammond, 1914)
 Photos from Survey HABS MD-109, Oaklands, Contee Road, Contee, Prince George's County, MD (Library of Congress, 1936/1940)

Houses completed in 1798
Buildings and structures in Laurel, Maryland
Houses in Prince George's County, Maryland
Georgian architecture in Maryland
Contee family